Jobst Brandt (January 14, 1935 – May 5, 2015) was an American mechanical engineer, inventor, bicycle enthusiast, educator, and author.

Early life
Brandt was born in New York City, where his father, the German-born agricultural economist Karl Brandt, was a professor at the New School for Social Research. The family moved to Palo Alto in 1938. Jobst Brandt studied mechanical engineering at Stanford University, graduating in 1958. After two years of military service in the US Army Corps of Engineers, stationed near Frankfurt, Germany, he found employment at Porsche. His subsequent employers included Hewlett Packard, SLAC National Accelerator Laboratory, and Avocet, a bicycle accessories brand. At Avocet, he was involved in the development of a cyclocomputer (patent 6,134,508), touring shoes (patent 4,547,983), and a high-performance bicycle tire, and published The Bicycle Wheel, a unique treatise on wheelbuilding which became a best-seller.

Legacy
From the late 1980s until the early/mid 2000s, the era of the Usenet newsgroup, Jobst Brandt was a prolific contributor to rec.bicycles.tech and other public forums. His authoritative explanations and incisive, sometimes tart opinions on bicycle technology, as well as the detailed descriptions of his inspiring bike holidays in the Alps and epic one-day rides in the Santa Cruz Mountains, brought him a wide readership among avid bicyclists well beyond the Bay Area, in the nascent online community.

References

External links
The Bicycle Wheel book by Jobst Brandt, published by Avocet
 Archive of rec.bicycles.tech postings, mostly authored by Jobst Brandt
Accumulating altimeter with ascent/descent accumulation thresholds, US patent # 5058427 A
Cycling Legend Jobst Brandt Passes Away, by Matt Phillips, Bicycling magazine
Tom Ritchey: A Tribute to Jobst, Ritchey Design Current News, Friday, May 22nd, 2015
Frequently Asked Questions about Bicycles and Bicycling

Male touring cyclists
American male cyclists
People from Palo Alto, California
2015 deaths
Writers from New York City
Stanford University alumni
American mechanical engineers
Engineers from California
20th-century American inventors
1935 births
Engineers from New York City
Cycling writers